Athletics competitions at the 1977 Central American Games were held at the Estadio Flor Blanca in San Salvador, El Salvador, between November 29 – December 1, 1977.

A total of 37 events were contested, 23 by men and 14 by women.

Medal summary
Gold medal winners and their results were published.  A complete list of medal winners can be found on the MásGoles webpage
(click on "JUEGOS CENTROAMERICANOS" in the low right corner).  Gold medalists were also published in other sources.  A couple of results can be found in the archives of Costa Rican newspaper La Nación.

Men

Women

Notes
*: Original model javelin.

Medal table

References

Athletics at the Central American Games
Central American Games
1977 in El Salvador
International athletics competitions hosted by El Salvador